Laura del Río García (born 5 February 1982) is a Spanish football manager and former player who played as a forward. She last managed men's club Flat Earth FC.

She used to play for Bristol Academy in England's FA WSL. Prior to that, she played for AD Torrejón, CE Sabadell and Levante UD in the Spanish Superleague, FC Indiana in the W-League, 1. FFC Frankfurt in the German Bundesliga, and Boston Breakers and Philadelphia Independence in the WPS. Del Río scored 14 for the senior Spain women's national football team, before a dispute with the coach caused her to quit the national team.

Club career
Del Río began her career at AD Torrejón in 1999 before moving to Levante UD the following year. In her two seasons in Valencia she won two doubles as Levante cruised through the Superliga Femenina and the Copa de la Reina. Del Río subsequently spent two seasons at CE Sabadell and then returned to Levante, where she remained for the next four years, winning an additional League in 2008 and two more Cups.

In 2008, she left Levante to play abroad for the first time, playing in the W-League for FC Indiana. She scored 33 goals in her two years in the W-League, making it into the All-League team. In summer 2009 she signed for European powerhouse 1. FFC Frankfurt. Starting the season as a reserve, she made herself a place in the starting eleven for a few weeks after scoring in three consecutive games coming from the bench. Overall, she scored six goals in just ten matches in the Bundesliga, as she left Frankfurt in December to sign for Boston Breakers, marking her Women's Professional Soccer debut. For the 2011 season she transferred to Philadelphia Independence, with whom she reached the championship play-offs. In the final she missed the team's final penalty to finish runners-up.

Del Río joined English FA WSL club Bristol Academy in 2012. Under coach Mark Sampson the club finished second in the 2013 FA WSL and were losing finalists in the 2012–13 FA Women's Cup. In January 2015 Bristol confirmed that del Rio had left the club after scoring 14 goals in 47 games.

She returned to the United States, signing for National Women's Soccer League club Washington Spirit. She served two assists in 11 appearances in 2015, before her season was ended by injury. She also missed the entire 2016 season following surgery on her ankle. She continued her career in Spain, with ambitious Segunda División club CD Tacón, signing for Madrid CFF a year later.

International career
Del Río was the top scorer of the 2000 Under-18 Euro, where Spain made it to the final for the first time.

For many years Del Río was a key player of Spain's national team, scoring 14 goals. Despite this she has not been called for the past few years following a clash with manager Ignacio Quereda.

International goals

Managerial career
After her retirement, in August 2019 Del Río signed as head coach of Flat Earth FC becoming the first woman at the helm of a team in the Spanish fourth division. However, she was sacked in October, but she continued in the club's structure with the aim to develop a women's team.

Honours
FC Indiana
 2008 W-League Central Conference Championship
 2009 W-League top scorer
 2009 W-League All-League Team
 2009 All-Central Conference Team

References

External links
 
 Boston Breakers profile

1982 births
Living people
Spanish women's footballers
Spain women's international footballers
Spanish expatriate women's footballers
Expatriate women's footballers in England
Expatriate women's footballers in Germany
Expatriate women's soccer players in the United States
1. FFC Frankfurt players
Boston Breakers players
Philadelphia Independence players
Bristol Academy W.F.C. players
Lesbian sportswomen
LGBT association football players
Spanish LGBT sportspeople
Footballers from Madrid
Women's Super League players
Primera División (women) players
Levante UD Femenino players
Washington Spirit players
National Women's Soccer League players
Spanish expatriate sportspeople in Germany
Spanish expatriate sportspeople in the United States
Spanish expatriate sportspeople in England
Madrid CFF players
Women's association football forwards
F.C. Indiana players
Real Madrid Femenino players
Spanish football managers
Female association football managers
AD Torrejón CF Femenino players
Women's Professional Soccer players